SG1 commonly refers to Stargate SG-1, a television show.

SG1 may also refer to:
 SG1 (or SG/1), a version of the Heckler & Koch G3 rifle
 SG1, a minor planet notation indicating the thirty-third discovery in late September of a given year, see provisional designation in astronomy
 1941 SG1, the asteroid 1546 Izsák
 1955 SG1, the asteroid 4300 Marg Edmondson
 1973 SG1, the asteroid 14792 Thyestes
 1974 SG1, the asteroid 2756 Dzhangar
 1987 SG1, the asteroid 6474 Choate
 1989 SG1, the asteroid 7934 Sinatra
 1992 SG1, the asteroid 7250 Kinoshita
 Scanlan SG-1, a glider
 Schlachtgeschwader 1, a German Luftwaffe unit during World War II
 SG1 postcode district, in the SG postcode area, in Stevenage in the United Kingdom

See also 
 SGI (disambiguation)
 SGL (disambiguation)